Gravity Hook is a vertically scrolling video game designed by Adam Saltsman and published by Semi Secret Software for web browsers in 2008. The game was remade into Gravity Hook HD and released for both browsers and iOS in 2010.

Gameplay
In this game the player attempts to use a futuristic grappling hook to climb out of an underground, secret base in order to reach the surface.

Reception

The iOS version received "average" reviews according to the review aggregation website Metacritic.

References

External links
 Official website for Gravity Hook HD (archived)
 
 

2008 video games
Action video games
Browser games
Indie video games
IOS games
Science fiction video games
Semi Secret Software games
Single-player video games
Video games developed in the United States